Ancylolomia likiangella is a moth in the family Crambidae. It was described by Stanisław Błeszyński in 1970. It is found in Yunnan, China.

References

Ancylolomia
Moths described in 1970
Moths of Asia